Hämeenlinnan Härmä (abbreviated Härmä) is a football club from Hämeenlinna, Finland. The club was formed in 1967 and their home ground is Kaurialan kenttä. The men's football first team currently plays in the Kakkonen (Third tier in Finland). Härmä took the place of FC PoPa for season 2012 when the club went bankrupt after the 2011 season.

Current squad

External links
Official website

Football clubs in Finland
Hämeenlinna
Association football clubs established in 1967
1967 establishments in Finland